Ron George Round Barn is a round barn northeast of the U.S. village of Romeoville, Illinois. It was originally constructed for Frank Eaton c. 1912–13 in Bolingbrook, Illinois.

History
Wilbur J. Fraser, who designed most of the round barns in Illinois, encouraged his brother-in-law Frank Eaton to construct such a barn. Eaton was living in the nearby settlement of Plainfield at the time. The $1,500 building served nine horse stalls and may have served cows as well. It was named after Eaton's young grandson Ron George. Ownership of the barn was later transferred to George, who maintained the property until the 1970s.

George Round Barn was listed on the National Register of Historic Places by the National Park Service in December 1982, four months after four other round barns joined the Register as part of the Multiple Property Submission (MPS), Round Barns in Illinois. In 1998, in an effort to prevent its demolition, the barn was dismantled and moved elsewhere in Bolingbrook. It was finally reconstructed in 2007.

Architecture
The single-hip roof has wooden shingles. The central silo is elliptical and is accessed from the loft. The main entrance was originally on the northwest side of the barn. The original building materials are still in use. At its original location, the barn abutted two large sheds, one to the east and one from the south. The round design was believed to be more efficient than the typical rectangular barn.

References

Round barns in Illinois
National Register of Historic Places in Will County, Illinois
Barns on the National Register of Historic Places in Illinois